Postumus Cominius Auruncus was a two-time consul of the early Roman Republic.

In 501 BC, Cominius was consul with Titus Larcius, who Livy says was appointed as the first dictator of Rome. Other sources indicate the beginnings of hostilities with the Latins and a conspiracy among slaves during their term.

As the consuls of 493 BC, Cominius and Spurius Cassius Vecellinus were elected towards the end of the First secessio plebis in 494 BC.  They also conducted a census.

Cominius achieved a military victory against the Volsci.  He initially defeated a force from the town of Antium, then took the towns of Longula (to the north of Antium) and Pollusca.  He laid siege to the town of Corioli and despite being attacked by a second force of Volsci from Antium, he achieved victory through the distinguished actions of Gaius Marcius Coriolanus, and captured Corioli.

In 488, he was among the envoys (legati), all of consular rank, sent to Coriolanus.

A puzzling and textually incomplete passage in Festus lists Cominius among several men who were burned publicly near the Circus Maximus in 486 BC. Valerius Maximus says that a tribune of the plebs burned nine colleagues for conspiring with Spurius Cassius Vicellinus, a consul in this year who plotted to make himself king. Since the plebeian tribunes numbered ten only much later, and since the listed names indicate that the men were of consular rank and patrician status, this incident during the Volscian Wars remains mysterious.

See also
 Cominia gens

References

6th-century BC Roman consuls
5th-century BC Roman consuls
6th-century BC births
486 BC deaths
Year of birth unknown
Auruncus, Postumus
People executed by burning